Koruj may refer to:
 Koruj, Isfahan
 Koruj, Sabzevar, Razavi Khorasan Province